Jaime Aparicio Rodewaldt (born 17 August 1929) is a Colombian former hurdler who competed in the 1948 Summer Olympics and in the 1956 Summer Olympics. He was born in Lima.

References

1929 births
Living people
Sportspeople from Lima
Colombian male hurdlers
Colombian male sprinters
Olympic athletes of Colombia
Athletes (track and field) at the 1948 Summer Olympics
Athletes (track and field) at the 1956 Summer Olympics
Athletes (track and field) at the 1951 Pan American Games
Athletes (track and field) at the 1955 Pan American Games
Pan American Games gold medalists for Colombia
Pan American Games silver medalists for Colombia
Pan American Games medalists in athletics (track and field)
Central American and Caribbean Games gold medalists for Colombia
Competitors at the 1950 Central American and Caribbean Games
Competitors at the 1954 Central American and Caribbean Games
Central American and Caribbean Games medalists in athletics
Medalists at the 1951 Pan American Games
Medalists at the 1955 Pan American Games
20th-century Colombian people